Brimsdown railway station is on the Lea Valley line that forms part of the West Anglia Main Line, serving the neighbourhood of Brimsdown in the London Borough of Enfield, north London. Its three-letter station code is BMD and it is in Travelcard zone 5.

The station and all trains serving it are operated by Greater Anglia.

Brimsdown station was used in 1951 as a location for part of the Alexander Mackendrick film The Man in the White Suit, starring Alec Guinness, as the station where Sidney Stratton tries to buy a ticket near the end of the film.

History
The station itself (which at one time was to be named Green Street) was financed by a local landowner and developer, and built by builder W Bangs & Co. The station opened on 1 October 1884, and services were operated by the Great Eastern Railway.

A signal box built by McKenzie and Holland was provided with 15 levers to operate points and signals, and this was enlarged in 1899 to have 32 levers. In 1928 it was recorded as having a 42-lever frame, so further expansion had clearly taken place in the intervening years.

Some goods sidings were located on the up side, and a short branch to the Royal Small Arms Factory at Enfield Lock joined these from the east. There was also a siding to a power station.

In 1923, Brimsdown station was taken over and operated by the London & North Eastern Railway as a result of the grouping of the UK's railways into four major companies.

The station was bombed on 22 July 1944; the signal box was destroyed.

Following nationalisation of the railways in January 1948, Brimsdown became part of Eastern Region of British Railways.

The lines through Brimsdown were electrified on 5 May 1969. Prior to the completion of electrification in 1969, passenger services between Cheshunt and London Liverpool Street through Brimsdown station were normally operated by Class 125 diesel multiple units (which had been purpose-built for the line in 1958).

On sectorisation in the 1980s the station was managed and served by Network SouthEast

Since 1990

Track and signals
As with most of the UK, management of the nationally owned track and signals passed in 1994 to Railtrack, which was succeeded by Network Rail in 2004.

In August 2002, signalling control for the relevant section of track was transferred to the Liverpool Street Integrated Electronic Control Centre (IECC).

Operation of passenger services
Following privatisation in 1994, operation of the station was allocated to a business unit before being taken over by West Anglia Great Northern (WAGN) in January 1997, at the time owned by Prism Rail. National Express acquired the franchise-holder in July 2000.

The WAGN franchise was replaced in 2003 by the One franchise later renamed National Express East Anglia.

Oyster Card readers came into use on 2 January 2010.

In February 2012 operation of the station changed once again, with Abellio Greater Anglia taking over the franchise.

Service
There is a half-hourly service southbound to London Liverpool Street via Hackney Downs, and two trains per hour northbound to Hertford East. Sundays there is an hourly service towards Stratford via Lea Bridge and to Hertford East.

Crossrail 2
The 2015 Crossrail 2 public consultation suggested that Brimsdown may in the future be served by trains on this route.

Connections
London Buses routes 191, 307 and 491 serve the station.

References

External links

Enfield, London
Railway stations in the London Borough of Enfield
Former Great Eastern Railway stations
Railway stations in Great Britain opened in 1884
Greater Anglia franchise railway stations